Neil Darrow Strauss, also known by the pen names Style and Chris Powles, is an American author, journalist and ghostwriter. He is best known for his book The Game: Penetrating the Secret Society of Pickup Artists, in which he describes his experiences in the seduction community in an effort to become a "pick-up artist." He is a contributing editor at Rolling Stone and also wrote regularly for The New York Times.

Early life and education 
After graduating from high school at the Latin School of Chicago in 1987, Strauss attended Vassar College, then transferred to and subsequently graduated in Psychology from Columbia University in 1991. While in school he began his career writing for Ear, an avant-garde magazine, and editing his first book, Radiotext(e), an anthology of radio-related writings for the postmodern publisher Semiotext(e). He moved on to The Village Voice, where, prior to becoming a reporter and critic, he took on tasks ranging from copyediting to fact-checking to writing copy.

Career
Strauss was invited by Jon Pareles to become a music critic at The New York Times where he wrote the Pop Life column and front-page stories on Wal-Mart's CD-editing policies, music censorship, radio payola, and the lost wax figures of country music stars.

He was then invited by Jann Wenner to become a contributing editor at Rolling Stone where he wrote cover stories on Kurt Cobain, Madonna, Tom Cruise, Orlando Bloom, the Wu-Tang Clan, Gwen Stefani, Stephen Colbert, and Marilyn Manson.

He won the ASCAP Deems Taylor Award for his coverage of Kurt Cobain's death for Rolling Stone and his profile of Eric Clapton in The New York Times Arts & Leisure section. Strauss also contributed to Esquire, Maxim, Spin, Entertainment Weekly, Details, and The Source in addition to writing liner notes for albums by Nirvana and others. He has also appeared in Beck's music video Sexx Laws which also featured Jack Black, in Thirty Seconds to Mars' video Up in the Air, and he made a brief appearance as a cancer patient in episode 4, season six of Curb Your Enthusiasm.

The Game and the seduction community 
After leaving The New York Times to ghostwrite Jenna Jameson's memoirs, Strauss joined a sub-culture of pick-up artists known as the seduction community, creating the persona of "Style" in 2001 and pseudonym of "Chris Powles", eventually publishing an article in The New York Times about his experiences in 2004. In 2005, he published The Game: Penetrating the Secret Society of Pickup Artists (Regan Books, 2005), a book about his transformation into "Style", a pickup artist under the tutelage of Mystery.  In addition to documenting his experiences with pickup artists like Mystery, Steve P, Rasputin (Hypnotica), Ross Jeffries, and numerous others, it also describes his interactions with celebrities including Britney Spears, Tom Cruise, and Courtney Love.

The book made a month-long appearance in The New York Times bestsellers list in September–October 2005, and reached the #1 position on Amazon.com immediately after its release in the United States. Strauss appeared on various TV shows, including The View and ABC Primetime, and he participated in many book signings. It was optioned to be made into a film by Spyglass Entertainment, with Chris Weitz adapting and producing.

After publishing the book, Strauss temporarily retired as a pickup artist and settled with a longtime girlfriend Lisa Leveridge, who played guitar in Courtney Love's band The Chelsea.

An article in the Sunday Mirror suggested that Leveridge broke up with Strauss in February 2006 to date Robbie Williams. Strauss denied the Williams rumor, but confirmed his breakup with Leveridge on his mailing list a few months later.

His follow-up book, the graphic novel How to Make Money Like a Porn Star, was published on September 26, 2006. The same year, "Shoot", Strauss' short film about becoming a rock star, was released. He co-wrote, directed and performed in Shoot. Also in 2006, in collaboration with Dave Navarro and Entourage writer Cliff Dorfman, he created a one-hour TV drama The Product for FX.  He also worked with James Gandolfini on a show, Roadies, for HBO.  In 2007, he released a follow-up to The Game, Rules of the Game, a two-book boxed set.

Strauss has continued to be involved with pickup artistry through his dating coaching company Stylelife Academy, founded in 2007. Most of the coaching is done by employed coaches, rather than Strauss himself, though he does make appearances at yearly conferences and in some video products sold by the company.

In 2012, Strauss released a board game/party game as a follow up to The Game and Rules of the Game called "Who's Got Game? The Game with Benefits."

Strauss is credited with popularizing the pick-up artist community and making its existence widely known.  In an October 2015 interview he said of that community "there are some really damaged people with hateful and distorted views of reality gathering other people who share those views", attracting people with "neurotic wounds" and with "character disorders", trying to find help and to change themselves.

Marriage and divorce
On August 31, 2013, Strauss married the model Ingrid De La O, whom he met in 2010. Before the wedding, he held a funeral-themed bachelor's party, laying to rest his 'Style' persona.

In March 2015, Strauss had a child and shared the news on his website, along with information on his new book, The Truth: An Uncomfortable Book About Relationships, which was released on October 13, 2015. The Truth, a sequel to The Game, covers his struggles to build and maintain a relationship with Ingrid after his years of immersion in the seduction community.

Strauss and Ingrid De La O divorced in October 2018.
In February 2020, Strauss confirmed his divorce from Ingrid De La O on Gabrielle Reece's podcast and talked about his life after his divorce among other things.

Other works
On March 4, 2009, The New York Times wrote that Strauss (along with rock biographer Anthony Bozza) had started his own publishing company, Igniter, as an imprint of HarperCollins. Igniter's first title was The Man Behind the Nose, published in 2010. It was followed by Satan Is Real: The Ballad of the Louvin Brothers, published in 2012.

Strauss's book Emergency: This Book Will Save Your Life (Harper, 2009), for which he spent three years amongst survivalists, tax-dodgers, billionaire businessmen, and the government itself, was hailed by Rolling Stone as an "escape plan" for the current world crisis. It entered The New York Times bestseller list at No. 3. 
He received the presidents Volunteer Service Award for his search-and-rescue work during the writing of Emergency. The rights to the movie were picked up by Columbia Pictures, with Robert Downey Jr. attached as a producer and probable lead actor. In 2010, Strauss received the James Joyce Award from the Literary & Historical Society of University College Dublin.

Neil Strauss's 2011 release entitled Everyone Loves You When You're Dead: Journeys Into Fame and Madness was also a New York Times bestseller. Released March 15, 2011, the book is a compilation of 228 celebrity vignettes conducted throughout Strauss's career as a pop culture journalist.

Neil Strauss's 2015 release entitled The Truth: An Uncomfortable Book About Relationships was also a New York Times bestseller. Released in October, 2015, this autobiographical book covers his attempts to form and maintain a long-term relationship following his years in the seduction community.  It made the November 1, 2015 NYTimes bestseller list. Several detailed reviews were published in Grantland and the Chicago Tribune
after its publication.

In June, 2017, I Can't Make This Up: Life Lessons was published with co-author Kevin Hart and immediately was a #1 NY Times Bestseller.

In 2019, Strauss launched To Live and Die in LA., a true crime podcast following the death of Adea Shabani.  It hit No. 1 on the iTunes podcasts, and was in the top 10 for four months.

On December 5, 2021, Strauss became the first mainstream author to mint a book on Ethereum titled Survive All Apocalypses: From Machine Uprisings to Bear Markets.

Strauss also has a chapter of advice in Tim Ferriss' book Tools of Titans.

Near the end of 2021 Strauss began working on a fictional "tell-all" book about the NFT collection The Bored Ape Yacht Club, entitled Bored and Dangerous.

Notable works 
 The Long Hard Road Out of Hell with Marilyn Manson (1998) 
 The Dirt with Mötley Crüe (2001) 
 How to Make Love Like a Porn Star: A Cautionary Tale with Jenna Jameson (2004) 
 The Game: Penetrating the Secret Society of Pickup Artists (2005) 
 How to Make Money Like a Porn Star, illustrated by Bernard Chang (2006) 
 Rules of the Game (2007) 
 Emergency: This Book Will Save Your Life (2009) 
Everyone Loves You When You're Dead: Journeys Into Fame and Madness (2011) 
The Truth: An Uncomfortable Book About Relationships (2015) 
I Can't Make This Up: Life Lessons (2017)
Survive All Apocalypses: From Machine Uprisings to Bear Markets (2021)

References

External links
 

American writers about music
Celebrity biographers
Jewish American writers
Ghostwriters
Columbia College (New York) alumni
Latin School of Chicago alumni
Living people
Naturalised citizens of Saint Kitts and Nevis
Pickup artists
The New York Times writers
Vassar College alumni
Year of birth missing (living people)